The Giants is a 2011 Belgian drama film directed by Bouli Lanners, written by Lanners and Elise Ancion, starring Zacharie Chasseriaud, Martin Nissen, Paul Bartel, Didier Toupy, Karim Leklou, Marthe Keller and Gwen Berrou. Shot in the Ardennes in Belgium and Luxembourg, produced by Jacques-Henri Bronckart and Jani Thiltges for Versus Production, it was released in Belgium on October 12, 2011.

The Giants had its world premiere in the Directors' Fortnight at the 2011 Cannes Film Festival on May 20, where it won the SACD Prize and the Art Cinema Award. It has received high praise from film critics and is considered one of the best Belgian films of that year, winning five Magritte Awards, including Best Film and Best Director.

Plot
Abandoned at their late grandfather's house for the summer, teenage brothers Zak and Seth are left to their own devices. With the endless possibilities of summer fun and adventure to be had in the idyllic Belgian countryside, they feel the world is their oyster. But when money runs short and with no help in sight, the boys scheme to support themselves by renting their deceased grandfather's house to a local drug dealer, but things don't go exactly as planned.

Cast
 Zacharie Chasseriaud as Zak
 Martin Nissen as Seth
 Paul Bartel as Danny
 Didier Toupy as the dealer
 Karim Leklou as Angel
 Marthe Keller as Rosa
 Gwen Berrou as Marth

Release
The film premiered on 20 May in the Directors' Fortnight at the 2011 Cannes Film Festival. The film was subsequently screened at various film festivals, including Festival International du Film Francophone de Namur and BFI London Film Festival, and premiered in the United States at the Santa Barbara International Film Festival on January 27, 2011. The Belgian regular release was on 12 October 2011 through O'Brother Distribution. Haut et Court bought the distribution rights for France and Eye Film Instituut bought the Dutch distribution. The film was released in France on 2 November 2011 and in the Netherlands on 26 January 2012. As of November 6, 2011, The Giants has grossed $211,657 in Belgium and $119,816 in France. Following its wins at the 2nd Magritte Awards, it was announced O’Brother Distribution would re-release the film in Belgium on 8 February 2012.

The Giants was released on DVD on March 7, 2012 in France. The home edition contains a making-of and a music video for the theme song "The Bony King of Nowhere" by Bram Vanparys.

Accolades

References

External links
 
 

2011 drama films
2011 films
Belgian drama films
Films set in Belgium
Films set in Luxembourg
Films shot in Belgium
Films shot in Luxembourg
2010s French-language films
Magritte Award winners
French-language Belgian films
Films directed by Bouli Lanners